Drakesville is a city in Davis County, Iowa, United States. The population was 164 at the time of the 2020 census.

History
Drakesville (historically Drakeville) was founded in 1847. It was named for its founder, John A. Drake.

Geography
Drakesville is located at  (40.799029, -92.481088).

Demographics

Drakesville is located in the center of Iowa's fastest growing Amish community
http://www.iowaamish.com

2010 census
As of the census of 2010, there were 184 people, 76 households, and 47 families living in the city. The racial makeup of the city was 99.5% White and 0.5% from two or more races. Hispanic or Latino of any race were 0.5% of the population.

There were 76 households, of which 25.0% had children under the age of 18 living with them, 50.0% were married couples living together, 10.5% had a female householder with no husband present, 1.3% had a male householder with no wife present, and 38.2% were non-families. 27.6% of all households were made up of individuals, and 11.8% had someone living alone who was 65 years of age or older. The average household size was 2.42 and the average family size was 3.06.

The median age in the city was 41 years. 25.5% of residents were under the age of 18; 9.8% were between the ages of 18 and 24; 19% were from 25 to 44; 27.2% were from 45 to 64; and 18.5% were 65 years of age or older. The gender makeup of the city was 42.4% male and 57.6% female.

2000 census
At the 2000 census, there were 185 people, 78 households and 46 families living in the city. The racial makeup of the city was 96.22% White, 0.54% African American, and 3.24% from two or more races. Hispanic or Latino of any race were 2.70% of the population.

There were 78 households, of which 30.8% had children under the age of 18 living with them, 51.3% were married couples living together, 5.1% had a female householder with no husband present, and 41.0% were non-families. 33.3% of all households were made up of individuals, and 19.2% had someone living alone who was 65 years of age or older. The average household size was 2.37 and the average family size was 3.15.

Age distribution was 26.5% under the age of 18, 7.0% from 18 to 24, 28.6% from 25 to 44, 20.0% from 45 to 64, and 17.8% who were 65 years of age or older. The median age was 40 years. For every 100 females, there were 88.8 males. For every 100 females age 18 and over, there were 81.3 males.

The median household income was $26,875, and the median family income was $32,500. Males had a median income of $25,625 versus $23,438 for females. The per capita income for the city was $13,063. About 14.7% of families and 11.6% of the population were below the poverty line, including 2.6% of those under the age of eighteen and 26.9% of those 65 or over.

Education
The Davis County Community School District operates local area public schools.

References

Cities in Iowa
Cities in Davis County, Iowa